Ordrup Cemetery (Danish: Ordrup Kirkegård) is a cemetery in Ordrup in the northern suburbs of Copenhagen, Denmark. It is the principal cemetery for the districts of Skovshoved, Ordrup, and Charlottenlund in the parishes of Ordrup and Skovshoved.

History
The cemetery was created in 1892. The first burial took place on 22 July 1892. Gudmund Nyeland Brandt was gardener at the cemetery from 1901 to 1927. It was expanded in 1945.

Chapel
The chapel was designed by Edvard Thomsen. The relief above the main entrance was created by Einar Utzon-Frank.

Buildings
The chapel was designed by Andreas Clemmensen and completed in 1914. It has now been closed due to limited use.

Notable interments

See also
 Ordrup Cemetery

References

Parks and open spaces in Gentofte Municipality
Cemeteries in Copenhagen
1892 establishments in Denmark
Cemeteries established in the 1890s